Polyxenus lagurus, known as the bristly millipede is a species of millipede found in many areas of Europe and North America. It is covered with detachable bristles that have the ability to entangle ants and spiders that attack the animal.

References

Polyxenida
Millipedes of Europe
Millipedes of North America
Animals described in 1758
Taxa named by Carl Linnaeus